Divandarreh (Kurdish: Dîwandere – دیوانده‌ره‌, also Romanized as Dīvāndarreh, Dīvān Darreh, Dīvan Darra, and Dīwān Darreh) is a city and capital of Divandarreh County, Kurdistan Province, Iran. At the 2006 census, its population was 22,842, in 5,305 families.

The city is populated by Kurds.

References

Towns and villages in Divandarreh County
Cities in Kurdistan Province
Kurdish settlements in Kurdistan Province